

Friedrich-Wilhelm Bock (6 May 1897 – 11 March 1978) was a German Waffen-SS commander during World War II who led three SS divisions, the SS Division Hohenstaufen, 4th SS Polizei Division, Waffen Grenadier Division of the SS (2nd Latvian). He was awarded the Knight's Cross of the Iron Cross of Nazi Germany.

Awards
 Iron Cross (1914) 2nd Class (27 July 1917)
 Honour Cross of the World War 1914/1918 (1934)
 Clasp to the Iron Cross (1939) 2nd Class (21 August 1941)
 Iron Cross (1939) 1st Class (16 September 1941)
 Knight's Cross of the Iron Cross with Oak Leaves
 Knight's Cross on 28 March 1943 as SS-Obersturmführer and Oberstleutnant of the Schupo and commander of the II./SS-Polizei-Artillerie-Regiment 4
 570th Oak Leaves on 2 September 1944 as SS-Oberführer and commander of the 9. SS-Panzer-Division "Hohenstaufen"

References

Citations

Bibliography

 
 

1897 births
1978 deaths
People from Września
People from the Province of Posen
Prussian Army personnel
SS-Oberführer
Recipients of the Knight's Cross of the Iron Cross with Oak Leaves
Recipients of the clasp to the Iron Cross, 2nd class
German Army personnel of World War I
German police officers
Waffen-SS personnel